Eurocypria Airlines served the following scheduled destinations prior to its closure in November 2010.

References

Lists of airline destinations